Nogovitsyn is a Russian masculine surname, its feminine counterpart is Nogovitsyna. Notable people with the surname include:

Anatoliy Nogovitsyn (born 1952), Russian general
Nikolay Nogovitsyn (born 1948), Russian Nordic combined skier

Russian-language surnames